Three ships of the Royal Navy have been named HMS Hogue, after the battle of La Hogue, May 1692:

 , third-rate sail, converted to unarmoured screw vessel 1849, broken up 1865
 , launched 1900, was a  armoured cruiser, sunk in 1914.

Royal Navy ship names